In the context of local authorities in the United Kingdom, the term no overall control (abbreviated to NOC) refers to a situation in which no single political group achieves a majority of seats, analogous to a hung parliament. Of the 248 councils who had members up for election in the 2019 local elections, 73 (over a quarter) resulted in a NOC administration. In the 2021 election, 14 resulted in no overall control.

Administration in NOC councils 
Typically, if no party achieves overall control of a council, the largest grouping will form alliances to create an ad hoc governing coalition. Often local authorities have larger proportions of smaller party and independent members than the House of Commons, and when there is no overall control this often results in minor groups having more influence than their numbers alone would suggest.

In the result of No-overall Control, the largest party may attempt to govern as a minority administration, such as the Conservatives in Dudley and Thurrock or Labour in Stockport and Brighton and Hove. Parties may also work together to create a formal deal, which can range from a confidence and supply deal to full coalition. Deals, especially the looser kind, can occur between parties which are not traditionally aligned on a national level. For example, a minority Conservative administration was formed in 2019 in Bolton supported by the Liberal Democrats and UKIP whilst a Labour-UKIP formal coalition exists in Basildon. However, following the 2017 Aberdeen City Council election, all nine Labour councillors were expelled from the party for entering into a coalition with the Conservatives. Conversely, the two parties formed a coalition administration in Worcester following the 2019 elections.

It is possible for a council to be under no overall control even when there appears to be an overall majority, in particular in the case of a majority of independents, who commonly have no collective policies when elected. This can also arise when the council members divide on other than party lines. For instance, the 2004 elections to the Isle of Anglesey County Council returned more independents than all others put together, but only Plaid Cymru maintained a party group within the council, and not all of its elected members joined the group. The remainder of the council, including some members of other political parties, formed four non-partisan groups, none of which held a majority. However, the 2008 elections resulted in a group called the Original Independents gaining an overall majority.

See also 
 Coalition
 Hung parliament

References

External links 
 No Overall Control? - Hansard weighs up a hung parliament Guy Aitchison, Our Kingdom

Local government in the United Kingdom
Political terms in the United Kingdom